The Spy Dad is a 2003 Hong Kong comedy film produced, written and directed by Wong Jing and starring Tony Leung as the titular protagonist, Jones Bon, an action film star with obvious homage to James Bond 007 films while with also references to martial arts films by Bruce Lee.

Plot
Jones Bon is a famous action film star who specialized in playing the role of a superhero like James Bond. But he was as timid as a mouse in real life. His cowardice caused his wife, Isabel, to divorce him leaving him as a single parent to take care of his two lovely daughters, Cream and Crispy. Isabel returned to Hong Kong to shoot a blockbuster with Jones. Interpol agent Titman followed the mad scientist Dr. Donno to Lungyi's hideout where the latter manufactured an Intelligence Degeneration Virus. When Titman seized the container of the Intelligence Degeneration Virus and attempted to arrest them, a gunfight broke out. The container was hit by a bullet and the Intelligence Degeneration Virus leaked out. Titman was infected by the virus, but he still escaped with the Ultra-SARS Virus.

Cast
Tony Leung Ka-fai as Jones Bon
Candice Yu as Isabel Kwan
Jordan Chan as Titman
Gillian Chung as Cream
Chapman To as Love Kwan
Teresa Mo as Barbara
Eric Kot as Dr. Donno
Elvis Tsui as Lungyi
Meme Tian as Janet
Wai Wah as Banana
Edison Chen as Ronald
Jim Chim as Mr. and Mrs. Tung
Michael Chan as Great
Tommy Yuen as Juno
Rosemary Vandenbroucke as Rosemary
Pak Suet as Hailey
Tats Lau as IQ
Perrie Lai as Mrs. Yip
Hawick Lau as bellboy
Joe Cheng as Golden Toe
Marco Mak as Olio man
Gary Mak as Mr. Lee
Sunny Luk as Leung Fun
Bobby Yip as appears in "Matrix" computer
Winnie Chan as Ice Cream
Bill Lo as Titman's superior officer
Mak Siu-wah as Great's bodyguard
Leon Head as Mr. Baron
Ho Wai-yip

Box office
The film grossed HK$5,429,623 at the Hong Kong box office during its theatrical run from 23 October to 19 November 2003 in Hong Kong.

See also
Wong Jing filmography

External links

The Spy Dad at Hong Kong Cinemagic

The Spy Dad film review at LoveHKFilm.com

2003 films
2000s spy films
Hong Kong action comedy films
2000s spy comedy films
2000s crime comedy films
Hong Kong slapstick comedy films
2000s parody films
Films about actors
2000s Cantonese-language films
Films directed by Wong Jing
China Star Entertainment Group films
Films set in Hong Kong
Films shot in Hong Kong
Parody films based on James Bond films
2003 comedy films
2000s Hong Kong films